The Punishment of Shirvanskaya (Georgian:Sasdjeli) is a 1926 Soviet silent adventure film directed by Ivane Perestiani. It is a sequel to The Crime of Shirvanskaya.

Cast
 Maria Shirai as Vicountess Shirvanskaya  
 Aleksandr Shirai as Douglas McLin   
 Pavel Yesikovsky as Misha  
 Sofia Jozeffi as Duniasha 
 Kador Ben-Salim as Tom Jackson
 Marius Jakobini as Jalmar

References

Bibliography 
 Rollberg, Peter. Historical Dictionary of Russian and Soviet Cinema. Scarecrow Press, 2008.

External links 
 

1926 films
Soviet silent feature films
Georgian-language films
Films directed by Ivan Perestiani
Soviet black-and-white films
Soviet adventure films
1926 adventure films
Silent adventure films
Soviet-era films from Georgia (country)